The AN/FPS-7 Radar was a Long Range Search Radar used by the United States Air Force Air Defense Command.

In the mid-1950s General Electric developed a radar with a search altitude of 100,000 feet and a range of 270 miles. This radar was significant in that it was the first stacked-beam radar to enter into production in the United States. The antenna was fed signals from several feed horns arranged in a vertical stack, producing a series of horizontal beams separated vertically in space. By comparing the returns from the different feeds, altitude information could be determined without the need for a separate height-finder radar.

Designed to operate in the L-band at 1250 to 1350 MHz, the radar deployed in late 1959 and the early 1960s. The AN/FPS-7 was used for both air defense and air traffic control in New York, Kansas City, Houston, Spokane, San Antonio, and elsewhere. 

In the early 1960s a modification called AN/ECP-91 was installed to improve its electronic countermeasure (ECM) capability. About thirty units were produced.  Another modification was the AN/FPS-107 which also operated in the L-Band which was manufactured by Westinghouse.

References

 AN/FPS-7, 7A, 7B, 7C, 7D @ radomes.org
 AN/FPS-7 @ fas.org
  Winkler, David F. (1997), Searching the skies: the legacy of the United States Cold War defense radar program.  Prepared for United States Air Force Headquarters Air Combat Command.

External links

Ground radars
Radars of the United States Air Force
General Electric radars
Military equipment introduced in the 1950s